Sudis is a genus of barracudinas, with two currently recognized species:
 Sudis atrox Rofen, 1963 (fierce pike smelt)
 Sudis hyalina Rafinesque, 1810

The generic name is from Latin sudis, which referred to a wooden stake, but was also used by Pliny the Elder to describe a barracuda-like fish.

References

Paralepididae
Taxa named by Constantine Samuel Rafinesque